Derick Hougaard (born 4 January 1983), more commonly known as the 'Liefling of Loftus' was a South African professional rugby union player who played for Leicester Tigers and Saracens in England. He normally played at flyhalf. Hougaard played for the Blue Bulls in the Currie Cup competition in South Africa and the Bulls in the international Super Rugby competition.

In the 2002 Currie Cup final against the Golden Lions,  Hougaard broke Naas Botha's 15 year record for points scored in a Currie Cup final of 24 by scoring 26, (1 try, 2 drop goals and 5 penalties). This feat at the start of his career and his excellent goal kicking success ratio during the following years earned him the accolade "Liefling van Loftus", an Afrikaans phrase meaning the "sweetheart of Loftus Versfeld Stadium" in Pretoria. Each time Hougaard scored points for the Bulls at Loftus, the chorus of a Gé Korsten song named "Liefling" was played in the stadium.

Hougaard made his test debut at the age of 20 for the Springboks during the 2003 World Cup as a reserve during the 72 to 6 win over Uruguay at Subiaco Oval in Perth, he also scored his first international points, successful in a conversion. After resuming his role as a reserve in the next match against England, Hougaard was promoted to flyhalf for the remaining three games that South Africa played at the World Cup. At the close of the World Cup, Hougaard, with five caps to his name had produced 48 points, including two tries. In the 2003 world cup match against , Hougaard was knocked out by a legal but hard tackle from Brian Lima.

The 2007 Super 14 semi-final saw Hougaard scoring all of his side's 27 points, by means of 8 penalties and a drop goal, against the Canterbury Crusaders at Loftus Versfeld in Pretoria. This equalled Adrian Cashmore of the Auckland Blues's 1998 record for most points by an individual in a Super Rugby semi-final. This victory was historic since it set up the first ever Super Rugby final between two South African teams. The 2007 Super 14 season was also a personal best in Hougaard's Super Rugby career, having scored 161 points in 14 matches.

In 2008, Hougaard signed for Leicester Tigers rejoining previous Blue Bulls coach Heyneke Meyer as a replacement for Andy Goode who had moved to CA Brive. He made his début against Bath in October 2008.

In 2009, Hougaard signed for Saracens.

References

External links
Tigers profile
Derick Hougaard on bluebulls.co.za
Currie Cup Individual Records on superrugby.co.za
Super 14 Records on superrugby.co.za

South African rugby union players
Afrikaner people
South African people of Danish descent
South Africa international rugby union players
Bulls (rugby union) players
Blue Bulls players
Rugby union fly-halves
1983 births
Living people
People from Cederberg Local Municipality
University of Pretoria alumni
Leicester Tigers players
Rugby union players from the Western Cape